The Red Day (Swedish: Röda dagen) is a 1931 Swedish comedy film directed by Gustaf Edgren and starring Sigurd Wallén, Dagmar Ebbesen and Sture Lagerwall. It was shot at the Råsunda Studios in Stockholm. The film's sets were designed by the art director Vilhelm Bryde.

Cast

References

Bibliography 
 Qvist, Per Olov & von Bagh, Peter. Guide to the Cinema of Sweden and Finland. Greenwood Publishing Group, 2000.

External links 
 

1931 films
Swedish comedy films
1931 comedy films
1930s Swedish-language films
Films directed by Gustaf Edgren
Swedish black-and-white films
1930s Swedish films